Danny Michel is a Canadian songwriter and producer.

Highlights
Between 2006 & 2015 Michel performed over 70 times as the musical guest on Stuart McLean's The Vinyl Cafe.

In 2008  "Feather, Fur & Fin" landed on the Playlist for the Planet released by the David Suzuki Foundation. Michel performed on Suzuki's Blue Dot Tour as well as his 75th birthday party in 2011.

In 2019, Michel performed for Dr. Jane Goodall at her 85th birthday party in Toronto.

In 2022, had a hit with his single “Don’t Be So Hard on Yourself” which is a joyful post-Covid anthem of self-acceptance.

Belize & The Garifuna Collective
In 2011 Michel relocated to Belize to record with The Garifuna Collective, an Afro-Amerindian cultural group, on the album Black Birds Are Dancing Over Me. The album landed a Juno Award nomination in the world music category and a sold-out summer tour of North America with The Garifuna Collective as his band. In June 2013, the album was long-listed for the 2013 Polaris Music Prize and released in Canada on Six Shooter Records and worldwide on Cumbancha Records.

The Ocean Academy School Fund
While in Belize, Michel created "The Danny Michel Ocean Academy Fund", helping raise scholarships for the Caye Caulker Community School, a small non-profit community high school in Belize. To date, his fund has raised $109,911.16 USD for the school, and he volunteers there when he can.

The Arctic / Khlebnikov Project
In 2017 Michel released Khlebnikov, a classical-based album written and recorded with film composer Robert Carli aboard the Russian ice-breaker, Kapitan Khlebnikov, during an 18-day Arctic expedition through the Northwest Passage with Canadian astronaut Chris Hadfield and a collection of artists from around the world. He won two Canadian Folk Music Awards for Khlebnikov at the 13th Canadian Folk Music Awards, for Producer of the Year (with Carli) and the Pushing the Boundaries award.

Dan's Space Van
Dan’s Space Van is a mobile web series created and hosted by Michel. The show takes place in an original customized 1978 GMC Vandura (airbrushed in 1980 in a Star Trek theme). The show features interesting people and musical guests who perform in the van. Past guests include Apple Co-Founder Steve Wozniak, Astronaut Chris Hadfield, Sarah Harmer, Alan Doyle, Blue Rodeo, Barenaked Ladies, 54-40, Fred Penner, The Milk Carton Kids, Bahamas, Joel Plaskett, Hawksley Workman, Steve Poltz, Kevin Breit, Irish Mythen, Alysha Brilla, Del Barber, Leeroy Stagger, Emm Gryner, Lindy Vopnfjord, Matt Mays, Dustin Bentall, Kendel Carson, Shane Koyczan, Barney Bentall, Mark Lalama, Rose Cousins, and more.

Awards
1996 Won - Kitchener Waterloo Arts Awards

2003 Nominated - "New Artist of the Year" The Juno Awards

2007 Nominated -  "Music dvd of The Year" The Juno Awards

2013 Nominated - "World Music Album Of The Year" The Juno Awards

2013 Nominated - Polaris Music Prize

2017 Won - "Producer of the Year" - Canadian Folk Music Awards

2017 Won - Oliver Schroer "Pushing The Boundaries" Award - Canadian Folk Music Awards

Discography 

Official Albums
1999 Fibsville - Independent
2001 In the Belly of a Whale - Independent
2003 Tales from the Invisible Man - Maple Music/Universal
2006 Valhalla - Maple Music/Universal
2008 Feather, Fur & Fin - Independent
2010 Sunset Sea - Independent
2012 Black Birds Are Dancing Over Me - Six Shooter Records/Stone Tree Records
2016 Matadora - Six Shooter Records
2017 Khlebnikov - Independent
2018 White & Gold - Independent

Others
 Loving the Alien, The Songs Of David Bowie (2004) Maple Music/Universal
 DM & the Black Tornados Live DVD (2007) Independent
 Live in Winnipeg (2010) Independent

References

External links 
 

1970 births
Canadian pop singers
Canadian male singer-songwriters
Canadian singer-songwriters
Living people
Musicians from Ontario
Canadian record producers
People from the Regional Municipality of Waterloo
Canadian session musicians
Six Shooter Records artists
20th-century Canadian male singers
Canadian Folk Music Award winners
21st-century Canadian male singers